Bethesda, Ontario may refer to::

Bethesda, Simcoe County, Ontario
Bethesda, York Regional Municipality, Ontario